South Elkhorn is an unincorporated community in Carroll County, Illinois, United States. South Elkhorn is east of Milledgeville.

References

Unincorporated communities in Carroll County, Illinois
Unincorporated communities in Illinois